Linux is a family of computer operating systems based on the Linux kernel.

Linux may also refer to:

 9885 Linux, an asteroid
 Linux distribution, an operating system made as a collection of software based on the Linux kernel
 Linux kernel, an operating system kernel

See also 
 List of Linux distributions